ACS Central Science is a monthly peer-reviewed open access scientific journal covering chemistry and related fields. Its title refers to the phrase "central science", which has long been used to describe the role played by chemistry in connecting the physical and life sciences. 

Established in 2015, it is the first fully open-access journal published by ACS Publications, the American Chemical Society's publishing arm. The editor-in-chief is Carolyn R. Bertozzi (Stanford University). 

ACS Central Science publishes 100-200 papers/year (compared to approximately 3,000 articles for JACS).

References

External links

Chemistry journals
American Chemical Society academic journals
Publications established in 2015
English-language journals
Open access journals